Philip James Pfeifer (born July 15, 1992) is an American professional baseball pitcher for the Canberra Cavalry of the Australian Baseball League. He previously played college baseball for the Vanderbilt Commodores of Vanderbilt University.

Amateur career
Pfeifer graduated from Farragut High School in Farragut, Tennessee. He played for the school's baseball team, and set a state record by recording 46 wins. He enrolled at Vanderbilt University to play college baseball for the Vanderbilt Commodores baseball team. In 2012, he played collegiate summer baseball with the Orleans Firebirds of the Cape Cod Baseball League. Pfeifer was suspended for the 2014 season due to substance abuse issues, but returned to the team in 2015.

Professional career

Los Angeles Dodgers
The Los Angeles Dodgers selected Pfeifer in the third round, with the 101st overall selection, of the 2015 MLB Draft. The Dodgers signed Pfeifer and assigned him to the Ogden Raptors where he pitched  scoreless innings for the season. Pfeifer began 2016 with the Great Lakes Loons and was later promoted to the Rancho Cucamonga Quakes.

Atlanta Braves
On June 30, 2016, the Dodgers traded Pfeifer and Caleb Dirks to the Atlanta Braves for Bud Norris, Dian Toscano, a player to be named later (Alec Grosser), and cash. The Braves assigned Pfeifer to the Carolina Mudcats and he was promoted to the Mississippi Braves in July. In 34 combined games between Great Lakes, Rancho Cucamonga, Carolina and Mississippi, Pfeifer posted a 4–1 record and 3.02 ERA with sixty strikeouts in  total innings. In 2017, he played for both Mississippi and the Gwinnett Braves, pitching to a combined 1–5 record and 3.49 ERA in 41 total games between both clubs, and in 2018, he returned to pitch for both Mississippi and Gwinnett, going 2–3 with a 5.73 ERA in 39 games. He returned to Mississippi to begin 2019 before being promoted to the Gwinnett Stripers. Over thirty games (18 starts) between both clubs, Pfeifer went 6–8 with a 2.97 ERA, striking out 159 over  innings.

Pfeifer was added to the Braves 40–man roster following the 2019 season. Following his father's death on July 1, 2018, Pfeifer planned to retire from professional baseball and enroll in law school after the 2019 season ended. Instead, Pfeifer continued pitching in the Australian Baseball League, was added to the Braves 40–man roster, and participated in spring training at the major league level. He did not play a minor league game in 2020 due to the cancellation of the minor league season caused by the COVID-19 pandemic.

On February 23, 2021, Pfeifer was designated for assignment by Atlanta after the signing of Jake Lamb was made official. On February 26, Pfeifer was outrighted to the Triple-A Gwinnett Braves. On March 14, 2021, Pfeifer was released.

San Francisco Giants
On March 20, 2021, Pfeifer signed a minor league contract with the San Francisco Giants organization that included an invitation to Spring Training. He pitched to a 7.13ERA over 35.1 innings between AAA Sacramento and AA Richmond, making 4 starts and 10 appearances in relief. He elected free agency at the end of the season on November 7, 2021.

Canberra Cavalry
On November 12, 2022, Pfeifer signed with the Canberra Cavalry of the Australian Baseball League.

References

External links

1992 births
Living people
Baseball pitchers
Baseball players from Knoxville, Tennessee
Canberra Cavalry players
Carolina Mudcats players
Farragut High School alumni
Florida Fire Frogs players
Great Lakes Loons players
Gwinnett Braves players
Gwinnett Stripers players
Mississippi Braves players
Ogden Raptors players
Orleans Firebirds players
Rancho Cucamonga Quakes players
Richmond Flying Squirrels players
Sacramento River Cats players
Vanderbilt Commodores baseball players
American expatriate baseball players in Australia